Sandycove and Glasthule railway station serves the suburban areas of Sandycove (on the coast) and Glasthule (just inland) in Dún Laoghaire–Rathdown, Ireland.

The building is on a bridge as the rail line is in a cutting. Because of the station's altitude at sea level and the consequent moisture content of the earth, the track at, and surrounding, this station is laid on concrete rather than wooden sleepers.

The ticket office is open between 05:45-00:15 AM, Monday to Sunday.

History
The station opened on 11 October 1855 as Kingstown & Sandycove, renamed Sandycove in 1861 and Sandycove & Glasthule in 1967. The station was electrified in 1983 with the arrival of DART services.

Transport services 

There are bus stops right outside the station on Sandycove Road served by the following:

Dublin Bus Routes:

 7d - Mountjoy Square to Dalkey, via Dun Laoghaire
 7N Nitelink from Dublin city centre to Shankill, via Dún Laoghaire (Fri & Sat only)

Go-Ahead Ireland routes:

 59 - Dún Laoghaire Station to Killiney, via Dalkey
 111 - Dalkey to Bride's Glen, via Dún Laoghaire Station. This route provides a connection to the Luas Green Line terminus at Brides Glen

Private operator routes:

 Aircoach route 703 from Killiney to Dublin Airport, via Glasthule

A large pay and display car park is located adjacent to the station.

See also
 List of railway stations in Ireland

References

External links
Irish Rail Sandycove and Glasthule Station Website

 
Iarnród Éireann stations in Dún Laoghaire–Rathdown
Railway stations opened in 1855
1855 establishments in Ireland
Railway stations in the Republic of Ireland opened in the 19th century